Yeungnam University Station is a station of Daegu Metro Line 2 in Dae-dong, Gyeongsan, North Gyeongsang Province, South Korea.

See also 
 Yeungnam University

External links 

  Cyber station information from Daegu Metropolitan Transit Corporation

Daegu Metro stations
Gyeongsan
Railway stations opened in 2012
Metro stations in North Gyeongsang Province
Yeungnam University